Nancy Cooper is an American journalist and news executive serving as the global editor-in-chief of Newsweek magazine.

She previously served as deputy executive producer on The Takeaway, a public radio show produced by WNYC, and as an editor at MSNBC.com. She joined International Business Times in 2014 and moved to Newsweek in 2018 as editor.

Newsweek 

An email Cooper sent to her staff was featured in a Columbia Journalism Review article, with the subject line “What is a Newsweek story?”  The email contained four requirements for any story published on Newsweek.com. One, it must contain original reporting. Two, it must provide a unique angle or new information. Three, the reader must care about it. And four, the news must be news. CJR said, based on interviews with Newsweek reporters, they were not given enough time to complete these requirements, given that Cooper mandates that they write four stories per day, with a clear emphasis on getting clicks.

In a response, Copper disagreed with the general conclusions of the article.

In an Axios 2022 article in response to Newsweek's ownership issues and associated lawsuits, Cooper said, "The lawsuit has nothing to do with me. That's the technical truth and the emotional truth too ... What the guys fight out on Mount Olympus — not my problem." The lawsuit is the latest in a series of ethics issues that have plagued the company for years, including: Journalists were fired for their attempt to cover investigations into the company in 2018, prompting a series of public resignations; Newsweek's parent company was caught buying fraudulent traffic to boost ad sales that same year; It was reported that the outlet incentivized reporters to write clickbait stories for traffic gains.

References 

American women journalists
Women magazine editors
Year of birth missing (living people)
Living people
American magazine editors
Newsweek people
21st-century American women